Sirsal is a village in the Indian state of Haryana, in the Kaithal region. It currently has a total population of 7,696. Most of the villagers are either of the Turan Ror & Shandilya Brahmin Gotra clan. The two Gotras own almost all of the agricultural land around the village. The majority of the village's population is employed in the agricultural sector, although there are a few private businesses and government offices. Sirsal is also well known for producing  kabaddi player, Deep also known as Ford & Naveen Sirsal

Census Information

Education 
There is a government boys' school up to 10th standard and a government girls' school up to 12th standard in the humanities branch, as well as multiple private schools. Village literacy is approximately 59.8% (4,604 people).

Nearby 

There is a transport system which links Sirsal to the nearby towns of Nissing, Rasina, and Pundri, and larger cities such as Karnal or Kaithal

Facilities available in village 
In the village, there is an animal hospital, primary health center, post office, senior secondary boys & girls high schools, several Hindu temples, privately run clinics and also pharmacies.

Employment
80% of the village residents are dependent on agricultural work, while some others work in the government and the military. Many also manage retail shops in nearby towns such as Nissing or Pundri.

References

Villages in Kaithal district